Pau-Pyrénées Whitewater Stadium is the home training facility for the French national canoe slalom team.  It was first used to train the French team for the 2008 Summer Olympics in Beijing.  It 2009, it was the first of three venues used in the canoe slalom World Cup. It is also a whitewater park for recreational use by the general public.

History and Design

The town of Pau has long been a center of activity for French canoe slalom.  The natural rapids in the center of town are still equipped with hanging slalom gates.  But the sport is increasingly conducted on artificial whitewater, and the presence in Pau of two Olympic medalists, Tony Estanguet and his older brother Patrice, helped to make Pau the site of this new 11.7 million € facility.

It is located beside a small dam upstream from town, where it uses diverted river water supplemented by pumped recirculation when the river's streamflow is low.  The artificial channels are lined with boulders embedded in concrete, and the visible instream flow diverters are natural rocks, giving the course a natural appearance, similar to that of the nearby Parc Olímpic del Segre on the Spanish side of the mountains.  The moveable plastic bollards common to many such courses are not used here.

2009 & 2012 World Cup

For the July 2009 World Cup race (left), there were 14 downstream gates and 6 upstream gates.  Most of the racers backed through downstream gates #3 and #16 in order to set up for upstream gates #4 and #17.  For the 2012 race, there were 25 gates for the semi-finals and finals. For the heats, with only 18 gates, the six upstream gates were in the same spots but with lower numbers: 4, 6, 10, 12, 14, & 18.  In two places, a barrier was added connecting an island to the right bank and sending all flow around the left side of the island.

Video
Tony Estanguet 2012

References

Artificial whitewater courses
Sports venues completed in 2008
2008 establishments in France
Buildings and structures in Pau
Sport in Pau, Pyrénées-Atlantiques
21st-century architecture in France